Talasila Kranthi Kumar was an Indian film director, producer, and screenwriter known for his works predominantly in Telugu cinema.
He won two Filmfare Awards and four Nandi Awards. In 1985, he directed Sravanthi, which won the National Film Award for Best Feature Film in Telugu  that year. In 1991, he directed Seetharamayya Gari Manavaralu, which was premiered in the Indian panorama section, at the 1991 International Film Festival of India. 

In 2000 he directed 9 Nelalu, premiered retrospective at the Toronto International Film Festival. He has garnered the National Film Award, five state Nandi Awards and two Filmfare Awards South. He died on 9 May 2003.

Early life
Born in Penamaluru in Vijayawada, Andhra Pradesh, he studied M.A. and L.L.B. before entering the film world in 1968.

Awards
National Film Awards 
National Film Award for Best Feature Film in Telugu (director) - Sravanthi (1986)

Filmfare Awards South
Filmfare Best Film Award (Telugu) - Swathi (1984)
Filmfare Best Director Award (Telugu) – Seetharamayya Gari Manavaralu (1991)

Nandi Awards
 Best Feature Film - Gold - Sarada (1973)
 Best Feature Film - Gold - Swathi (1984)
 Best First Film of a Director - Swathi
 Best Director - Seetharamayya Gari Manavaralu (1991)
 Best Screenplay Writer - Sravana Meghalu (1986)

Cinema Express Awards
Best Director – Seetharamayya Gari Manavaralu (1991)

Filmography

Director
1984 Swathi
1984 Agni Gundam
1985 Sravanthi
1985 Hero Boy
1986 Swati (Hindi)
1987 Aranyakanda
1987 Saradamba
1987 Gowthami
1990 Neti Siddhartha
1991 Seetharamayya Gari Manavaralu
1992 Akka Mogudu
1993 Rajeswari Kalyanam
1993 Amma Koduku
1993 Sarigamalu
1994 Bhale Pellam
1996 Baalina Jyothi (Kannada)
1998 Padutha Teeyaga
1999 Arundhati
2000 9 Nelalu

Producer
1973 Sarada
1974 Urvasi
1976 Jyothi
1977 Kalpana
1977 Aame Katha
1978 Pranam Khareedu
1979 Punadhirallu
1979 Shri Jagannath
1980 Mosagadu
1980 Sardar Papa Rayudu
1981 Nyayam Kavali
1981 Kirayi Rowdylu
1982 Idi Pellantara
1983 Sivudu Sivudu Sivudu
1984 Aaj Ka M.L.A. Ram Avtar
1984 Agni Gundam
1984 Swathi 
1990 Neti Siddhartha
1995 Rikshavodu 
1999 Preminchedi Endukamma
2001 9 Nelalu

References

External links

Telugu film directors
Filmfare Awards South winners
Nandi Award winners
2003 deaths
20th-century Indian film directors
Film producers from Andhra Pradesh
People from Krishna district
21st-century Indian film directors
Telugu film producers
Screenwriters from Andhra Pradesh
Telugu screenwriters
20th-century Indian dramatists and playwrights
Film directors from Andhra Pradesh
1942 births
20th-century Indian screenwriters